Isla San Jerónimo, is an island in the Pacific Ocean on the west side of the Baja California Peninsula. The island is part of the large Ensenada Municipality and accessed from Punta Baja near the community of El Rosario, Baja California.

Biology
Isla San Jerónimo has three species of reptiles: Anniella geronimensis (Baja California legless lizard), Salvadora hexalepis (western patch-nosed snake), and Uta stansburiana (common side-blotched lizard).

References

http://herpatlas.sdnhm.org/places/overview/isla-san-jer%C3%B3nimo/36/1/

Islands of Ensenada Municipality
Islands of Baja California
Uninhabited islands of Mexico